Matej Gaber (born 22 July 1991) is a Slovenian handball player who plays for SC Pick Szeged and the Slovenian national team.

He represented Slovenia at several international tournaments, including the 2012 European Championship, the 2013 World Championship, the 2015 World Championship, and the 2016 European Championship.

References

 

1991 births
Living people
Sportspeople from Kranj
Slovenian male handball players
Montpellier Handball players
SC Pick Szeged players
Expatriate handball players
Slovenian expatriate sportspeople in France
Slovenian expatriate sportspeople in Hungary
Olympic handball players of Slovenia
Handball players at the 2016 Summer Olympics
21st-century Slovenian people